Lodewijk "Lody" Roembiak (born 18 May 1969), is a Dutch former footballer who played for German Bundesliga club SV Werder Bremen during the 1998–99 and 1999–2000 football seasons.

Career
Born in Leiden, Roembiak made his professional debut for FC Den Haag in 1987. After just three appearances for the club, he joined Sparta Rotterdam. In the winter transfer window of the 1990–91 season, he moved to SC Cambuur. Following spells at FC Zwolle and De Graafschap, he signed for Turkish club Antalyaspor which he left for SC Veendam after just six months.

FC Aarau
In summer 1998, Roembiak joined FC Aarau where he went on to play two seasons.

Werder Bremen
In summer 1998, Roembiak signed for Werder Bremen from FC Aarau for a transfer fee of DM 500,000. In August 1998, he assisted Dieter Frey for the single goal in Werder Bremen's 1–0 win over Vojvodina Novi Sad in the first leg of the 1998 UEFA Intertoto Cup final. After scoring three goals and making three assists in the first half of the 1998–99 season, he suffered an injury to his patellar tendon in the winter break; the injury required surgery in April 1999, keeping him out of action until the end of the season.

In the 1998–99 season Roembiak made just two substitute appearances under manager Felix Magath. He was unable to regain his position in the starting lineup under new manager Thomas Schaaf and was loaned back to FC Aarau for the second half of the 1999–2000 season, where he played in 11 matches. In January 2001, Roembiak joined 2. Bundesliga side SV Waldhof Mannheim for the remainder of the season. He left Werder permanently in summer 2001, having scored three goals in 18 appearances in the Bundesliga. During his spell at Werder Bremen, he became a popular player and was given the nicknames "Lody" and "Kugel" ("ball").

Later years
In September 2001, he went on trial at Fortuna Sittard but the club chose not to sign him.

He later returned to former club SC Cambuur and also played for LVV Friesland.

References

External links
 
 Profile at Beijen.net

Living people
1969 births
Footballers from Leiden
Association football midfielders
Dutch footballers
ADO Den Haag players
Sparta Rotterdam players
SC Cambuur players
De Graafschap players
Antalyaspor footballers
SC Veendam players
FC Aarau players
SV Werder Bremen players
SV Waldhof Mannheim players
Eredivisie players
Eerste Divisie players
Bundesliga players
2. Bundesliga players
Süper Lig players
Dutch expatriate footballers
Expatriate footballers in Germany
Expatriate footballers in Switzerland
Expatriate footballers in Turkey